Işıkkale (meaning the "castle of light") is an ancient settlement in Turkey.

Işıkkale was established in the Taurus Mountains. Işıkkale is between two other archaeologically important sites; Karakabaklı and Sinekkale.

The settlement is situated on both sides of the road.

The original name of the settlement is not known. It  dates back to Hellenistic, Roman and the early Byzantine ages. There are many buildings, cisterns, wineries, and olive oil presses. In most of the buildings polygonal masonry is used . But there are also buildings of a later era such as a three-nave basilica.

References

Silifke District
Ancient Anatolia
Archaeological sites in Mersin Province, Turkey
Olba territorium